Death or Glory is the fifth studio album by German heavy metal band Running Wild, released 8 November 1989 through Noise Records. It is the band's last album with both guitarist Majk Moti and drummer Ian Finlay. Being one of their most successful releases, it contains the concert favourites "Riding the Storm" and "Bad to the Bone". The final track, "March On", was not included on the vinyl release due to space constraints.

The CD version (both the original and remastered) of the album contains 1991's Wild Animal EP, albeit with a different running order than that of the original. However, despite the presence of Wild Animal on the original pressing CD, neither the booklet nor back insert tray mention these songs. But the CD non-playing side (of the original pressing), however, does list the 4 songs from this EP. The booklet on the remastered version has the full info on including of the EP.

Running Wild filmed a live video to the song "Bad to the Bone", recorded in Düsseldorf. The song had some airtime at MTVs Headbangers Ball. "Riding the Storm" also had a live video that was also shot in Düsseldorf with a crowd of nearly 9,000 attendees.

The track "Bad to the Bone" was recorded by a cappella band van Canto and was released on their fourth studio album Break the Silence.

Critical reception 

Death or Glory was ranked number 285 in Rock Hard magazine's 2005 book The 500 Greatest Rock & Metal Albums of All Time and number 17 on Metal Hammers list of the 25 best power metal album of all time.

Death or Glory Tour 
A live VHS tape of the band playing a live concert at Düsseldorf during the Death or Glory Tour was released by Fotodisk and later by Bonsai Music.

The videotape features 11 tracks including a live version of three songs from Death or Glory ("Riding the Storm", "Bad to the Bone" and "Tortuga Bay").

Track listing 

The 2017 remastered version contains a second disc, featuring the following songs

Personnel 
 Rolf Kasparek – vocals, guitars
 Majk Moti – guitars
 Jens Becker – bass
 Iain Finlay – drums

Additional Musician
 Ladislav Křížek – backing vocals

Production
 Jan Němec – engineering, mixing
 Martin Becker – photography
 Sebastian Krüger – artwork
 Rock 'n' Rolf – producer
 Karl-U. Walterbach – executive producer

Charts

References 

Running Wild (band) albums
1989 albums
Noise Records albums